Christian Augustus Barman  (13 September 1898 – 1980) was a British industrial designer and administrator.

Barman was born in Antwerp, Belgium on 13 September 1898, the son of Thomas Gustav, who was a Norwegian sailor. Christian Gustav later changed his surname to Barman, from Barmen, the small island off the coast of Norway where his father was raised.

From 1916, Barman studied architecture at the University of Liverpool. He then ran his own architectural and design practice until 1935, when Frank Pick offered him the role of publicity officer at London Transport.

In 1931, he became a naturalised British citizen in 1931.

In 1934, he designed a chrome-plated metal electric fan heater for HMV, and copies are now in the permanent collections of MoMA in New York City and the V&A in London.

In 1948, he was appointed a Royal Designer for Industry. From 1949 to 1950, he was president of the Society of Industrial Artists, now the Chartered Society of Designers.

In the 1963 New Year Honours, Barman was awarded an OBE, "For services as Executive Member, Design Panel, British Transport Commission."

He was the author of several non-fiction works including a biography of Frank Pick, The Man Who Built London Transport, and a novel Ramping Cat (1941).

In 2010, TfL commissioned the Barman moquette, designed by WallaceSewell (Emma Sewell and Harriet Wallace-Jones) and manufacturered by Camira Fabrics. It was first used in 2011, on refurbished Central Line trains, and is now used on several deep level tube lines. The design incorporates the London Eye, the St Paul's dome, the Elizabeth Tower (Big Ben) and the two towers of Tower Bridge.

References

1898 births
1980 deaths
People from Antwerp
British designers
Alumni of the University of Liverpool
People associated with transport in London
Transport design in London
British industrial designers
Norwegian emigrants to England
British people of Norwegian descent
Officers of the Order of the British Empire